Hautot-le-Vatois is a commune in the Seine-Maritime department in the Normandy region in northern France.

Geography
The A29 autoroute passes through the commune's southern farmland.

Population

Places of interest
 The chapel of St. Geneviève, dating from the seventeenth century.
 The twelfth century church of Notre-Dame.

See also
Communes of the Seine-Maritime department

References

Communes of Seine-Maritime